Advocate Vasnatrao J More  (born 1 April 1947) is a member of the 14th Lok Sabha of India. He represents the Erandol constituency of Maharashtra and is a member of the Nationalist Congress Party (NCP) political party.

External links
  Official biographical sketch in Parliament of India website

Living people
1947 births
People from Maharashtra
India MPs 2004–2009
Marathi politicians
Nationalist Congress Party politicians from Maharashtra
People from Jalgaon district
Lok Sabha members from Maharashtra